SS Richard Caswell (MC contract 870) was a Liberty ship built in the United States during World War II. She was named after Richard Caswell, the first Governor of North Carolina, member of the Continental Congress, militia officer in the War of the Regulation and the American Revolutionary War. She was operated by the South Atlantic Steamship Company under  charter with the Maritime Commission and War Shipping Administration.

The ship was laid down by North Carolina Shipbuilding Company in their Cape Fear River yard on November 6, 1942, and launched on December 10, 1942.

Loss 
On July 16, 1943 while sailing unescorted the Caswell was torpedoed by the German Submarine U-513.  The first torpedo struck aft of the engine room and killed three men on watch.  Most of the crew abandoned ship but the Master and a party stayed aboard.  A second torpedo struck the vessel ten minutes later.  Fifteen minutes after that, the Caswell broke in half and sank.  Three officers and six sailors were killed.  Survivors were rescued by the USS Barnaget on July 22, 1943.

As a result of this action, Chief Engineer Harold Van Rensselear Forrest received the Merchant Marine Meritorious Service Medal for his efforts to rescue a wounded engine room wiper despite his own serious wounds, towing the other man half an hour to reach a lifeboat.

References 

Liberty ships
Ships built in Wilmington, North Carolina
1942 ships